Jakob Oettinger (born December 18, 1998), nicknamed Otter, is an American professional ice hockey goaltender currently playing for the  Dallas Stars of the National Hockey League (NHL). He played for Boston University during his collegiate career. After being part of the USA Hockey National Team Development Program, he was widely considered as a top prospect for the 2017 NHL Entry Draft. The Dallas Stars selected Oettinger in the first round, 26th overall, of the 2017 NHL Entry Draft.

Playing career
After spending his freshman year at Lakeville North High School, Oettinger committed to the USA Hockey National Team Development Program (USNTDP) Juniors for the 2014–15 season. Oettinger played two seasons with the USNTDP Juniors while committing to Boston University. He was drafted in the first round, 26th overall, of the 2017 NHL Entry Draft by the Dallas Stars.

Collegiate
During his freshman season at Boston University, Oettinger posted a 2.11 goals-against average and .927 save-percentage. During that season, Oettinger was named Hockey East Goaltender of the Month for the month of October, was a two-time Hockey East Rookie of the Week, a two-time Hockey East Defensive Player of the Week and was named Hockey East Top Performer four times. Thus, he was named to the Hockey East All-Rookie Team and Hockey East Second Team All-Star at the end of the year. During his second season at Boston University, Oettinger was named to the Hockey East All-Tournament Team of the 2018 Hockey East Men's Ice Hockey Tournament and earned the William Flynn Tournament Most Valuable Player award after he helped Boston win their ninth Hockey East Tournament title. Prior to the 2018–19 season, Oettinger was named an alternate captain for the Terriers, along with Chad Krys.

Professional
On March 25, 2019, Oettinger signed a three-year, entry-level contract with the Dallas Stars and was assigned to their AHL affiliate, the Texas Stars, on an amateur tryout contract. Upon joining the Texas Stars, Oettinger recorded a .897 save percentage and a 3.34 goals-against average in his first eight games. On March 3, 2020, he earned his first NHL call up as Ben Bishop dealt with a lower-body injury. On September 8, 2020, he made his NHL debut in relief of Anton Khudobin in the third period of the second game of the 2020 Western Conference Final against the Vegas Golden Knights. With Bishop remaining unavailable during the following 2020–21 season, Oettinger became the Stars' backup goaltender to Khudobin, making his regular season debut in a January 28, 2021 victory over the Detroit Red Wings. Over the course of the season he made 24 starts and appeared in relief a further 5 times, gradually edging ahead of Khudobin as the team's starting goaltender. He finished with a .911 save percentage.

Oettinger began the 2021–22 season playing in the AHL, appearing in 10 games with a 4–5–2 record. However, he was soon called up to play in the NHL again, with injury plaguing the team's other goaltenders. He became the starter on arrival, and earned a 30–15–1 record with a .914 save percentage in the regular season, credited as a key factor in the Stars qualifying for the 2022 Stanley Cup playoffs. The Stars earned the final wildcard berth and drew the Calgary Flames in the first round, a matchup where they were considered underdogs. However, the series proved far more competitive than expected, a fact that was widely attributed to Oettinger, who was dubbed "bar none, the first star of the first round" by The Hockey News. Oettinger lead all goaltenders in the first round with a .954 save percentage, also the second-highest in the history of the Stars, behind only Ed Belfour in the 1998 second round. The climax came in Game 7, where the Stars took the game to overtime despite the Flames making twice as many shots and attempts as the Stars, with Oettinger recording 64 saves, the second-highest in playoff history behind only Kelly Hrudey's 73 during the 1987 Easter Epic. The Stars were eliminated when Flames forward Johnny Gaudreau finally scored in overtime to end the game 3–2, with Oettinger commenting afterward that he felt he was "just scratching the surface of where I'm going to be one day."

On September 1, 2022, Oettinger signed a three-year, $12 million contract with the Stars. He began the 2022–23 season impressively, with a 5–1–0 record and a .960 save percentage over those games, before exiting an October 29 game against the New York Rangers with an unspecified lower-body injury. He returned to the Stars' active roster two weeks later.

Career statistics

Regular season and playoffs
Bold indicates led league

International

Awards and honors

References

External links
 

1998 births
Living people
American men's ice hockey goaltenders
Boston University Terriers men's ice hockey players
Dallas Stars draft picks
Dallas Stars players
Ice hockey players from Minnesota
National Hockey League first-round draft picks
People from Lakeville, Minnesota
Texas Stars players
USA Hockey National Team Development Program players